Jenny Ridderhof-Seven (24 October 1936 — 2014) was a Dutch tennis player.

Active during the 1960s, Ridderhof was associated with the ELTV club in Eindhoven. She won the Dutch national singles championship in 1963 and appeared in two ties that year for the Netherlands Federation Cup team. In 1968 she was non-playing captain of the Dutch side which made the Federation Cup final, losing to Australia.

Ridderhof originally competed under her maiden name "Seven", before marrying Frans Ridderhof in 1961.

See also
List of Netherlands Fed Cup team representatives

References

External links
 
 

1936 births
2014 deaths
Dutch female tennis players